Kōjin, also known as , is the Japanese kami (god) of fire, the hearth and the kitchen.  He is sometimes called Kamado-gami (竃神), literally the god of the stove.  He represents violent forces that are turned toward the betterment of humankind.

Mythology
The name Sambō-Kōjin means three-way rough deity, and he is considered a deity of uncertain temper.  Fire, which he represents, is a destructive force, as shown in the myth of Kagu-tsuchi, the original fire deity, whose birth caused his mother's death.  However, Kōjin embodies fire controlled and turned toward a good purpose.  He is said to destroy all impurity.  He is also responsible for watching over the household and reporting any misdeeds to the kami of the village or city.  These reports are discussed, and the according rewards or punishments assigned, by an assembly of gods in Izumo province in the tenth month of the traditional lunar calendar.

Kōjin is sometimes identified as an incarnation of Fudō Myō-Ō, who is likewise depicted as surrounded by flames and tasked with dealing with misdeeds.

As Kamado-gami, he is sometimes depicted as female.

Worship
Traditionally, a representation of Kōjin is placed near the hearth.  This representation might be a simple fuda (memorial tablet) in many homes, or it might be as elaborate as a statue, as is common in Buddhist temples.  In his statues, Kōjin is depicted with flaming hair, fangs, and a contorted face, and he often wields a bow and arrows.  He has two pairs of hands.  Some representations of Kōjin present him as possessing three heads.

The Kōjiki mentions an imperial script detailing instructions for worshipping Kōjin, in the form of Kamado-gami.

See also
 Agni
 Kagu-tsuchi, kami of fire
 Kitchen god
 Zàojūn, Chinese kitchen god
 Ông Táo, Vietnamese kitchen god
 Jowangshin, Korean kitchen god
 Kamuy-huci, an Ainu kitchen god
 Hestia, Greek goddess of the hearth
 Vesta (mythology), Roman goddess of the hearth
 Lares

Notes

References
Ashkenazy, Michael. Handbook of Japanese Mythology. Santa Barbara, California: ABC-Clio, 2003.
Philippi, Donald, trans., ed.  Kōjiki.  Tokyo: Tokyo University Press, 1968.

External links

JAANUS / Koujin 荒神 - Japanese Architecture and Art Net Users System

Buddhist gods
Japanese gods
Fire gods
Shinto kami
Buddhism in the Edo period
Domestic and hearth deities